John Pickering may refer to:

 John Pickering (dramatist), author of the play Horestes first published in 1567
 John Pickering (MP) (1585–1628), MP for Northamptonshire, 1626
 John Pickering (soldier) (died 1645), colonel of a regiment in the New Model Army
 John Pickering (judge) (1737–1805), American politician and judge
 John Pickering (Massachusetts politician), List of speakers of the Massachusetts House of Representatives
 John Pickering (linguist) (1777–1846), American linguist
 John Pickering (Australian politician) (c.1815–1891), South Australian politician
 John Pickering (musician), lead singer with The Picks, US vocal trio of the 1950s
 John E. Pickering (1918–1997) pioneer in the field of radiobiology, aviation medicine and space medicine and a Colonel in the United States Air Force
 John Frederick Pickering (1939–2018), professor and economic and business consultant, former member of the Monopolies and Mergers Commission and church commissioner
 John H. Pickering (1916–2005), founding partner of Wilmer, Cutler & Pickering, which became one of Washington D.C.'s most prominent law firms
 John Pickering (footballer) (1944–2001), professional footballer, coach and manager

See also
 Jack Pickering (1908–1977), English footballer